Ahmed Zabana Stadium is a multi-purpose stadium in Oran, Algeria.  It is currently used mostly for football matches. It is the home ground of MC Oran. The stadium holds 40,000.

History

The stadium was built in 1955 in the El Hamri district of Oran, known as Lyautey at the time, by mayor Henri Fouquès-Duparc. The stadium was inaugurated on 5 May 1957 with a capacity of 40,000 spectators, making it the biggest stadium in Africa at the time. After the independence of Algeria it was renamed Municipal Stadium. After it was named again Stade du 19 Juin 1965 in commemoration of the military coup of Ahmed Ben Bella by Houari Boumediene made at that date.

In 1992, the stadium was then renamed again to Stade Ahmed Zabana by the Algerian president at this time Mohamed Boudiaf, in honor of Algerian revolutionary Ahmed Zabana.

In January 2008, it was renovated to make it compatible with the practice of Rugby union. It was equipped with artificial turf (fifth generation) to replace natural grass in poor condition. In the 2016-17 domestic league season, tenants MC Oran drew an average home attendance of 12,000.

Matches
These are some historically important matches that have been played in the stadium around its history:

Football matches

Clubs

National

Football events

Algeria NT

Rugby Union matches

Statistic matches of Algeria football NT

See also

List of football stadiums in Algeria
List of African stadiums by capacity
List of association football stadiums by capacity

Notes & references

Notes

References

External links

 Ahmed Zabana Stadium file (kooora.com)

Football venues in Algeria
Sports venues in Oran
Stadium
Multi-purpose stadiums in Algeria
Sports venues completed in 1957
1957 establishments in Algeria